The 2004–05 season was the 84th season in the existence of Deportivo Alavés and the club's second consecutive season in the Segunda División.

Competitions

Overall record

Segunda División

League table

Results summary

Results by round

Matches

Copa del Rey

References

Deportivo Alavés seasons
Deportivo Alavés